Crossroads is a 2017 American psychological thriller short film directed by Marvin Nuecklaus and co-produced by Nuecklaus and Jerry TerHorst. The film stars Aubrey Reynolds, Joseph Lopez, and Wahayn Inello Clayton. The film was highlighted by No Film School, where it is listed among Studiobinder's "19 Best Short Films of All Time" and premiered at the Academy Awards qualifying HollyShorts Film Festival.

The film was shot in Lancaster, California.

Cast
 Aubrey Reynolds as Karen
 Joseph Lopez as Matthew
 Michael Caprarella as John D. Cain
 Wahayn Inello Clayton as Spencer

References

External links 
 

English-language Nigerian films
2017 films
2017 thriller films
2017 short films
2010s English-language films